Swiney  is a small village on the east coast of Scotland, 1 mile west of Lybster along the A99 road, in Caithness, Scottish Highlands and is in the Scottish council area of Highland.

Populated places in Caithness